Donwood may refer to:

Donwood, West Virginia, an unincorporated community and coal town in Kanawha County
Stanley Donwood, the pen name of English writer Dan Rickwood